Cratosilis is a genus of soldier beetle belonging to the family Cantharidae.

Cratosilis include species with a radical metamorphosis and distinctive larval, pupal, and adult stages (endopterygota) during development. Larvae are radically different from the adults in their structure and behaviour.

List of species
 Cratosilis denticollis (Schummel 1844)
 Cratosilis distinguenda (Baudi 1859)
 Cratosilis laeta (Fabricius 1792)
 Cratosilis sicula (Marseul 1864)
 Cratosilis theresae Pic 1901

References

Beetles of Europe
Cantharidae